is a passenger railway station located in the city of Inabe, Mie Prefecture, Japan, operated by the private railway operator Sangi Railway.

Lines
Daian Station is served by the Sangi Line, and is located 15.3 kilometres from the terminus of the line at Kintetsu-Tomida Station.

Layout
The station consists of a single side platform serving bi-directional traffic. The station building incorporates a travel office run by the Sangi Railway, and a library.

Platforms

Adjacent stations

History
The station building was rebuilt and renamed Daian Station on March 25, 1986.

Passenger statistics
In fiscal 2019, the station was used by an average of 403 passengers daily (boarding passengers only).

Surrounding area
former Daian Town Hall

See also
List of railway stations in Japan

References

External links

Sangi Railway official website

Railway stations in Japan opened in 1931
Railway stations in Mie Prefecture
Inabe, Mie